Stephen Barry Singleton (born 17 April 1959) is an English musician, currently residing in Sheffield, England. He was the saxophonist in the pop band ABC (which he left in 1984), starring in the 1983 short film Mantrap.

According to an interview Singleton did for the documentary Made in Sheffield, he was friends with Def Leppard's lead vocalist Joe Elliott when the two were young children. Along with Mark White and David Sydenham, he founded the electronic band Vice Versa in 1977. He also produced several issues of Steve's Papers, a Sheffield punk fanzine.

In the early 1990s, Singleton was a member of the band Bleep & Booster, who released an album on London Records and produced some remixes for East 17. Singleton also produced records by the Treebound Story (featuring a young Richard Hawley) and Libitina.

Singleton declined to participate in VH1's Bands Reunited in 2004, when attempts were made to reform ABC for a one-off performance. Only two members, Martin Fry and David Palmer, reunited and performed.

In 2015, Stephen Singleton and Mark White reformed Vice Versa.

Discography

References

External links
 
 
 

1959 births
English pop musicians
English rock saxophonists
British male saxophonists
British synth-pop new wave musicians
Living people
ABC (band) members
English new wave musicians
English record producers
Musicians from Sheffield
21st-century saxophonists